Giovanni Alloatti (Turin, Italy – 9 June 1934, Palermo, Italy) was an Italian racing driver. He drove six races between 1926 and 1934 of which he won two. His last race, the 1934 Targa Florio, was run in bad weather and Alloatti went over a bridge parapet on a train bridge. He succumbed to his injuries 20 days later.

Results

References

Year of birth missing
1934 deaths
Sportspeople from Palermo
Racing drivers from Turin
Mille Miglia drivers
20th-century Italian people